Akhta is an abandoned village in the Vayk Municipality of the Vayots Dzor Province of Armenia.

References

External links 

Former populated places in Vayots Dzor Province